White Nights is a 1957 romantic drama film directed by Luchino Visconti, based on Fyodor Dostoevsky’s 1848 short story of the same name. It was written for the screen by Visconti and Suso Cecchi d'Amico, and stars Maria Schell, Marcello Mastroianni, and Jean Marais. The film earned positive reviews from critics and audiences, and won the Silver Lion at the 18th Venice International Film Festival.

Plot
Late one winter night in downtown Livorno, a lonely young man named Mario meets an equally lonely young woman, Natalia, standing on a bridge. Mario is lonely for social reasons; he is a stranger and a newcomer to town, and is only there because of a recent work transfer. Natalia is lonely because she has always lived in isolation with an overbearing grandmother, even in the heart of the city. Her near-blind grandmother is extremely protective and refuses to allow her out at night, forcing her to sneak out. She fell in love with a dashing foreigner who had rented a room in her house. Though he reciprocated the love, he had to leave suddenly, promising to return in one year. She hasn't seen or heard from him since.

While both try to keep the relationship platonic, Mario rejects obvious offers of romantic attention from other women in the story, holding on to a fruitless obsession. They're soon forced to admit they've fallen in love, especially after Natalia's lover fails to return. Mario thanks the young woman for the moment of happiness she has brought him.

As snow falls, he proposes marriage and she accepts. However, in the midst of their ecstasy, the lover suddenly returns as promised. Overjoyed, Natalia runs to him and leaves a brokenhearted Mario behind. He is back at square one, and has put more energy into pursuing the fantasy of an obsession rather than any prospect of real love. He wanders off into the night, playing with a stray dog he had met earlier.

Cast 

 Maria Schell as Natalia
 Marcello Mastroianni as Mario
 Jean Marais as The Tenant
 Marcella Rovena as The Landlady
 Clara Calamai as The Prostitute
 Maria Zanoli as The Maid
 Dirk Sanders as Dancer
 Lys Assia as Singer
 Corrado Pani as Young Man

Production 
The entire film was shot on an elaborate soundstage set at Cinecittà Studios in Rome; recreating the streets, stores, waterways, and monuments of Livorno. In order to have misty backgrounds by night but a clear view on actors, director Visconti and cinematographer Giuseppe Rotunno could not use mist filters on camera lenses. Instead they used large rolls of tulle hanging from ceiling to the ground on the sets. Putting street lamps just behind, it worked perfectly for the desired effect.

Visconti cast Maria Schell after meeting her at film festival where she was a juror. Though he originally planned to dub her voice with a native Italian actress (as was standard practice at the time), he was impressed when she learned all her dialogue despite not speaking the language fluently, and let her loop her own lines. However, French actor Jean Marais was dubbed by Giorgio Albertazzi.

Adaptation 
According to academic Geoffrey Nowell-Smith, "In turning the Dostoevsky story into a film, Visconti got rid of the first-person narration and made the girl less of an innocent and, in fact, at times something of a hysteric and a tease. In the course of these changes, he also made the ending sadder. In the story, the narrator is allowed a little coda, in which he thanks the girl for the moment of happiness she has brought him. In the film, the hero is left alone, befriending the same stray dog he met at the beginning, back at square one, with no sense that the love he briefly felt has transformed him in any way."

Release

Critical reception 
White Nights holds an 88% "Positive" score on the review aggregator Rotten Tomatoes.

Accolades

Legacy 
The 2008 American film Two Lovers, though not an adaptation, was inspired by the short story as well as Visconti's film.

References

External links
 
 
 
 Le notti bianche an essay by Geoffrey Nowell-Smith at the Criterion Collection
 White Nights and Other Stories  by Fyodor Dostoyevsky (in English) at Project Gutenberg

1957 films
1957 romantic drama films
Italian romantic drama films
1950s Italian-language films
Italian black-and-white films
French romantic drama films
French black-and-white films
Films based on White Nights
Films directed by Luchino Visconti
Films scored by Nino Rota
Films set in Tuscany
Films shot at Cinecittà Studios
Films based on short fiction
1950s Italian films
1950s French films